Md. Ghulam Rabbani is an Indian politician serving as Cabinet Minister of State for Minority Affairs & Madrassah Education in Government of West Bengal. Rabbani belongs to All India Trinamool Congress. He was elected as MLA of Goalpokhar Vidhan Sabha Constituency in 2011, 2016 and 2021.

References

Living people
Trinamool Congress politicians from West Bengal
West Bengal MLAs 2011–2016
West Bengal MLAs 2016–2021
1970 births
20th-century Bengalis
21st-century Bengalis
People from Uttar Dinajpur district